Saeid Heidarirad (born 22 September 1990) is a Romanian handball player for Dinamo București.

References

External links 

 

1990 births
Living people
Iranian male handball players
Handball players at the 2014 Asian Games
Expatriate handball players
Iranian expatriates in Romania
Asian Games competitors for Iran
21st-century Iranian people